The 1981–82 DFB-Pokal was the 39th season of the annual German football cup competition. It began on 28 August 1981 and ended on 1 May 1982. In the final Bayern Munich defeated 1. FC Nürnberg 4–2. Bayern thus won the trophy for the sixth time. It was the last season, that the cup was held with 128 teams participating. Afterwards the competition was scaled down to 64 teams.

Matches

First round

Replays

Second round

Replays

Third round

Round of 16

Replays

Quarter-finals

Semi-finals

Final

References

External links
 Official site of the DFB 
 Kicker.de 
 1981–82 results at Fussballdaten.de 
 1981–82 results at Weltfussball.de 

1981-82
1981–82 in German football cups